"Down by the Henry Moore" is a single by Canadian artist Murray McLauchlan. Released in 1975, it was the fourth single from his album Sweeping the Spotlight Away. The song reached number one on the RPM Country Tracks chart in Canada in August 1975.

The song references several Toronto landmarks, including Kensington Market, The Silver Dollar, and Nathan Phillips Square, as well as the Henry Moore sculpture that is placed nearby.

Chart performance

References

1975 singles
Murray McLauchlan songs
True North Records singles
1974 songs
Songs about Canada
Culture of Toronto